Vaskino is the name of several rural localities in Russia:
Vaskino, Gaynsky District, Perm Krai, a village in Gaynsky District, Perm Krai
Vaskino, Kochyovsky District, Perm Krai, a village in Kochyovsky District, Perm Krai